Aspasius (c. 80 – c. 150) was a Peripatetic philosopher.

Aspasius may also refer to:

 Aspasius of Auch (died 560), Christian saint
 Aspasius of Ravenna (fl. 3rd century), Roman sophist
 Aspasius Paternus (fl. 3rd century), Roman senator

See also
 Aspasia (disambiguation)
 Aśvaka, an ancient people of present-day Afghanistan and Pakistan, also known as the Aspasioi